Paulo César Wanchope Watson (born 31 July 1976), more commonly known as Paulo Wanchope, is a Costa Rican football coach and former professional footballer 

As a player he was a striker who notably played in the Premier League for Derby County, West Ham United and Manchester City. He also had spells in La Liga and Major League Soccer for Málaga and Chicago Fire as well as Herediano, Al-Gharafa, Rosario Central and FC Tokyo. He was capped 73 times by Costa Rica, scoring 45 goals. Wanchope is the second most prolific goalscorer in the history of the Costa Rica national football team, behind Rolando Fonseca, with 45 goals in 73 international matches. Having scored against Brazil in 2002 and a brace against Germany in 2006, Wanchope is the top goalscorer for Costa Rica in the FIFA World Cup, a record he shares with Rónald Gómez.

As he is the former head coach of the Costa Rica national football team with a spell in charge between 2014 and 2015. He has also managed Herediano, Uruguay Coronado, CS Cartaginés and Pérez Zeledón.

Club career

Derby County
Born in Heredia, Wanchope began his career with CS Herediano moving to England to play with Derby County along with fellow Costa Rican Mauricio Solís on 27 March 1997. He cost Derby £600,000.

Wanchope marked his debut for Derby on 5 April 1997 with a memorable goal against Manchester United at Old Trafford, beating four United players before slotting past Peter Schmeichel during a 3–2 win – the goal was later voted the greatest in the club's history by the Derby fans as part of the club's 125th Anniversary Celebrations.

He scored 13 league goals in 1997–98 as Derby finished ninth – their highest finish since 1989 – and helped them go one better in 1998–99 when his nine goals that season helped the Rams finish eighth.

After scoring 28 goals in 83 games within two seasons for Derby, Wanchope was sold to West Ham United for £3.5 million on 16 July 1999.

West Ham United
Wanchope made his debut for West Ham on 28 July 1999, at Upton Park, against Heerenveen in the Intertoto Cup. His first West Ham goal came on 4 August 1999 in the away leg of the same tie. He scored 15 goals in 47 appearances in all competitions; his final game coming on 14 May 2000, at home to Leeds United. During his one year at Upton Park Wanchope formed a deadly partnership with Paolo Di Canio, the two scored a combined 31 league goals in the 1999–2000 season, and West Ham finished 9th in the Premier League, putting them in the top nine for the third consecutive season.
He was eventually sold to Manchester City at the start of the 2000–01 season, following the arrivals of Davor Šuker and Frédéric Kanouté, for a fee of £3.65million.

Manchester City
On 23 August 2000 he scored a hat-trick in a 4–2 win against Sunderland.
Wanchope earned a starting position at Manchester City, but was unable to help them avoid immediate relegation back to Division One at the end of the 2000–01 season, despite scoring nine league goals.

The following season was a mixed one for Wanchope. Despite missing large chunks of it through injury, he still managed 12 goals in just 15 games and often showed his best form. After City's return to the top flight as Division One champions he played almost no part, with injury once again keeping him on the sidelines – he missed the entire 2002–03 season.

However, he returned to play a vital part at the end of 2003–04 and scored some vital goals to help avoid relegation, including the winning goal against Newcastle United, which effectively made City safe. He managed six goals from 22 league games that campaign.

Post-Premier League

In August 2004, Wanchope was sold to Málaga CF of the Spanish La Liga for £500,000. He played 25 games for the club, scoring six goals.

In 2005, ESPN declared Wanchope's goal against Numancia the best of the entire 2004–05 Spanish First Division. In 2006, following the World Cup in Germany and short but successful stints with Al-Gharafa in Qatar and Herediano in his native Costa Rica, he signed with Argentine club Rosario Central, scoring five goals in 14 games.

On 29 December 2006, J1 League club FC Tokyo announced the acquisition of Wanchope on a transfer from Rosario Central. Along with local prospect Sota Hirayama, Wanchope allowed FC Tokyo to utilise a pair of large (190 cm+) strikers. He was released by FC Tokyo and subsequently signed a one-year deal with MLS team Chicago Fire.

Retirement
On 16 November 2007, after a 13-year career in football, Wanchope decided to put an end to his career, primarily based on how his old knee injury was affecting his performance on the field, the same injury that made him lose large parts of his career with Manchester City, making him unable to reach his best physical shape, an argument that was commonly criticized by the press during recent years in every club he played for. At his retirement press conference he manifested his interest in becoming a professional coach, looking forward to accomplishing it in England.

International career
He was a member of Costa Rica's youth national teams, playing in the 1995 FIFA World Youth Championship finals in the Qatar.

Wanchope would become hugely important to the senior Costa Rica national team, after making his debut in an October 1996 friendly match against Venezuela and playing for the team in the 2002 FIFA World Cup and several Gold Cups. On 8 October 2005, Wanchope became the all-time leading goal scorer for Los Ticos when he scored the first goal in a home win over the USA in the qualifying match that sent Los Ticos to the 2006 FIFA World Cup. Wanchope has twenty plus World Cup qualifier goals to his name.

On 9 June 2006, he scored twice in the opening game of the 2006 World Cup, a 4–2 loss to Germany. These two goals made Wanchope the inaugural Costa Rican to score twice in one World Cup match, and put him alongside Rónald Gómez as the sole Costa Ricans ever to score more than one World Cup goal. After the defeat to Germany, Costa Rica were defeated by both Ecuador and Poland. Thus Costa Rica finished last in their group and failed to qualify for the second round. Wanchope played his last game for his country in January 2008 when Sweden had come to visit Costa Rica. He played 25 minutes and then he was substituted.

Managerial career
He managed Club Sport Herediano from 2008 to 2009. He resigned citing that the team's performance was low, and that he wanted to further his studies in England. Having left Herediano, he expressed his dissatisfaction with the administration of the club.

Wanchope became an assistant to the Costa Rica national team coach, Jorge Luis Pinto. Upon Pinto's departure after the 2014 FIFA World Cup, Wanchope took over as interim national team coach.

In September 2014, he won the Copa Centroamericana with the Costa Rica national football team. On 31 January 2015, he was officially named as national team coach.

On 12 August 2015, Wanchope resigned as manager of Costa Rica's national team following a post-match brawl with a steward.

Personal life
Wanchope is a son of Costa Rican former international striker Vicente Wanchope and Patricia Watson and both his brothers, Javier and Carlos, also played for the national team. He is married to Brenda Carballo and they have a son and daughter. He is of Jamaican descent.

Career statistics

Club

International

Scores and results list Costa Rica's goal tally first, score column indicates score after each Wanchope goal.

Honours

Player
West Ham United
UEFA Intertoto Cup: 1999
Manchester City
Football League First Division: 2001–02
Costa Rica
UNCAF Nations Cup: 1999
Individual awards
Premier League Player of the Month: October 1997

Manager
Costa Rica
Copa Centroamericana: 2014
Cartaginés
Costa Rican Cup: 2022

References

External links

 

1976 births
Living people
Costa Rican people of Jamaican descent
People from Heredia Province
Association football forwards
Costa Rican footballers
Costa Rica international footballers
2001 Copa América players
2002 FIFA World Cup players
2006 FIFA World Cup players
Copa Centroamericana-winning players
C.S. Herediano footballers
Derby County F.C. players
West Ham United F.C. players
Manchester City F.C. players
Málaga CF players
Al-Gharafa SC players
Rosario Central footballers
FC Tokyo players
Chicago Fire FC players
Costa Rican expatriate footballers
Expatriate footballers in England
Expatriate footballers in Spain
Expatriate footballers in Qatar
Expatriate footballers in Argentina
Expatriate footballers in Japan
Expatriate soccer players in the United States
Premier League players
English Football League players
La Liga players
Qatar Stars League players
Argentine Primera División players
J1 League players
Major League Soccer players
Liga FPD players
Costa Rican football managers
C.S. Herediano managers
Costa Rica national football team managers
Costa Rican expatriate sportspeople in Spain
Costa Rican expatriate sportspeople in England
Costa Rican expatriate sportspeople in Japan
Costa Rican expatriate sportspeople in Qatar
Costa Rican expatriate sportspeople in Argentina
2015 CONCACAF Gold Cup managers
1998 CONCACAF Gold Cup players
2000 CONCACAF Gold Cup players
2002 CONCACAF Gold Cup players